Mors is a non-carbonated Russian fruit drink prepared from berries, mainly from lingonberry and cranberry (although sometimes bilberries, strawberries, raspberries or sea-buckthorn). It is made by boiling berries with sugar or honey and lemon juice, or by mixing pure juice with sweetened water. Some modern commercial brands use fermented and clarified juices blending with sugar syrup and drinking water. Instead of juice, fruit extracts may be used with the addition of aromatic essences, organic food acids, sugars, dyes, and drinking water.

Mors is sometimes mixed with vodka to make an alcoholic cocktail.

A recipe for Mors is in the Domostroy, a 16th century Russian set of household rules, but has likely been around longer.

See also
 Kissel
 Kompot
 List of Russian dishes
 Russian cuisine

References

Fruit drinks
Russian drinks
Ukrainian drinks